Ink Master: Grudge Match – Cleen vs. Christian is the eleventh season of the tattoo reality competition Ink Master that premiered on Paramount Network on August 28, instead of its original air date September 4, and concluded on December 18, 2018 with a total of 16 episodes. The show is hosted and judged by Jane's Addiction guitarist Dave Navarro, with accomplished tattoo artists Chris Núñez and Oliver Peck serving as series regular judges. The winner received $100,000, a feature in Inked magazine and the title of Ink Master.

The premise of this season was to have Ink Master veterans Christian Buckingham and James "Cleen Rock One" Steinke return to coach two teams of nine artists, similar to the premise of the previous season, and for them to settle their rivalry that began on the seventh season of the show. The live finale featured the final Grudge Match between the coaches where the number of artists that were left on their respective team gave each of them the power to sabotage each other, in which the winning coach would also receive $100,000.

The winner of the eleventh season of Ink Master was Tony Medellin, with Teej Poole being the runner-up. The winner of the Grudge Match was James "Cleen Rock One" Steinke.

Judging and ranking

Judging Panel
The judging panel is a table of three or more primary judges in addition to the coaches. The judges and the coaches make their final decision by voting to see who had best tattoo of the day, and who goes home.

Jury of Peers
Season 11 once again featured the jury of peers. But this time, the artist that wins best tattoo of the day gives their respective team the power to put up one artist for elimination.

Contestants
The first episode featured 22 artists competing to be one of the 18 artists that were split into two teams of 9 artists. The top 14, who were chosen by the judges and the coaches in a blind critique, chose which team to be on while the remaining 8 artists that were not selected went head to head in the knockout round that determined who got the final spots on Team Christian and Team Cleen.

Names, experience, and cities stated are at time of filming.

Notes

Chosen

Not chosen

Contestant progress
 Indicates the contestant was a part of Team Christian.
 Indicates the contestant was a part of Team Cleen.

  The contestant won Ink Master.
 The contestant was the runner-up.
 The contestant finished third in the competition.
 The contestant advanced to the finale.
 The contestant won Best Tattoo of the Day.
 The contestant won the Tattoo Marathon.
 The contestant was among the top.
 The contestant received positive critiques.
 The contestant received mixed critiques.
 The contestant received negative critiques.
 The contestant was in the bottom.
 The contestant was put in the bottom by the Jury of Peers
 The contestant was eliminated from the competition.
 The contestant was put in the bottom by the Jury of Peers and was eliminated from the competition.
 The contestant withdrew from the competition.
 The contestant returned as a guest for that episode.

Episodes

References

External links
 
 
 

Ink Master
2018 American television seasons